Richard E. "Rick" Dutrow Jr. (born August 5, 1959, in Hagerstown, Maryland) is an American thoroughbred racehorse trainer. He is currently serving a ten-year suspension administered by the racing commission in New York.

Background
His brother Anthony Dutrow is also a trainer. Their father, Richard E. Dutrow Sr., was one of Maryland racing's "Big Four" who dominated racing in that state during the 1960s and 1970s and who helped modernize flat racing training. At age sixteen, Rick Jr. began working as his father's assistant. In 1995, he set up his own public stable in New York after his father left the NYRA circuit to return to Maryland.

Training career
Dutrow's first major success came in 2005 when he won two Breeders' Cup races with Silver Train and Saint Liam. His 1,000th lifetime victory was with Kip Deville in the Frank E. Kilroe Mile on March 3, 2007.

In 2008, he trained Big Brown to Kentucky Derby and Preakness Stakes victories, although the colt failed to capture the Triple Crown with a last place finish in the 140th Belmont Stakes. At the time, Dutrow had been suspended or fined 72 times by US horse-racing authorities and had admitted regularly administering the steroid Winstrol to his horses including Big Brown. Nevertheless, Big Brown's accomplishments helped to make Dutrow one of the finalists for that year's Eclipse Award for Outstanding Trainer.

Suspension
On October 12, 2011, the New York State Racing and Wagering Board (NYSR&WB) suspended Dutrow from racing for 10 years and fined him $50,000, citing a long history of racing violations. This followed a decision by the Kentucky Horse Racing Commission's Licensing Review Committee not to renew his license in that state. Dutrow continued to train horses while he appealed the ruling of the NYSR&WB in court. His legal options in New York State were exhausted when the state's Court of Appeals denied his request for appeal on January 8, 2013. Barring a possible appeal in federal court, Dutrow would be suspended from January 17, 2013, until January 17, 2023.

On February 27, 2013, Dutrow filed a lawsuit with the United States District Court for the Eastern District of New York against the New York State Gaming Commission (former NYSR&WB), the Association of Racing Commissioners International (ARCI) and several other entities, seeking monetary damages and an overturning of his suspension. The suit alleges that Dutrow was "substantially and irreparably harmed" by the suspension and claims that he was deprived of due process under the law.

In March 2020, the Queens District Attorney's office re-opened its investigation in the Horse trainer Rick Dutrow's 10-year suspension, linked to syringes in his barn. There are new allegations of incriminating evidence having been planted in his barn. The New York State Gaming Commission database lists just four equine deaths on Dutrow's record in New York, and only one on the racetrack. That compares favorably with some of the top trainers currently competing on the New York circuit. In addition, although he has had numerous minor-to-moderate violations ranging from paperwork errors to overages of legal therapeutic drugs, Dutrow has never been found to have administered an illegal performance-enhancing substance to any of his horses.

In his defense, several people have supported his superior abilities as a horse trainer.
“He is by far the most conscientious, horse centric trainer I have ever hired,’’ said owner Lansdon B. Robbins, for whom Dutrow trained the stakes winner Offlee Wild. “He always put the horse first and was way ahead in diagnosing issues before big problems arose.” 

“No one treated his horses better than Rick,’’ said Patti Cerda, the former manager of the identification department for New York Racing Association. “You could eat off the floors of his barn.’’

And in his testimonial letter to the Gaming Commission, Dr. Bramlage wrote of Dutrow: ‘’To have trained as many horses at a high level for as long as he trained them and not have a single fatal injury on your record is a phenomenal testament to the care he gave his horses. [His] horses were sent to us early in the course of their diseases, before permanent damage had ensued. He and his staff recognized problems early and did not delay in getting them addressed. This is the primary reason he had so much success and so few injuries, in my opinion.’’

References

External links
Richard Dutrow Jr. NTRA biography
Rick Dutrow Jr. NYRA biography, page 70
ESPN.com: Dutrow may not be what racing's old guard hoped for, but he's the only hope the sport has
ESPN.com: The Dutrow Projects
ESPN.com: Dutrow's checkered past follows him to Derby spotlight
Breeders' Cup Biography
NBC: Dutrow can forget about the dark days

1959 births
Living people
American racehorse trainers
Sportspeople from Hagerstown, Maryland